Khlong Khwang is a khwaeng (sub-district) of Phasi Charoen District, Thonburi side of Bangkok.

Geography
Khlong Khwang is a northernmost part of the district, with total area of 2.992 km2 (1.155 mi2), regarded as the third largest area of the district (after Bang Wa, Bang Waek).

Its name means "impeded canal", according to the nature of the area, there are many khlongs (canal) intersecting each other. The main watercourses are Khlong Bang Chueak Nang, Khlong Ratcha Montri, Khlong Bang Waek, etc. These canals are also the dividing line of the administrative area.

Most of the area is a waterfront plain. It is a fruit orchard and agricultural area.

Adjoining sub-districts are (from north clockwise): Bang Chueak Nang in Taling Chan District, Bang Waek and Bang Duan in its district, Bang Khae Nuea and Bang Phai in Bang Khae District.

Demography
In late 2020, it had a total population of 10,928 people.

The local way of life is still bonded with the canal. Some canals also have boat noodles sold in boat by sailing along the vicinity waterways, once in a blue moon in modern times.

Transportation
Bang Waek Road
Phutthamonthon Sai 1 Road
Khlong Bang Chueak Nang
Khlong Ratchamontri

Places
Wat Maphrao Tia Temple
Chair of Saint Peter Church
St. Peto Village
Kadinia Ville
SISB Thonburi
St. Peter's School
Nisachol Tennis Court

Note: not to be confused with another Khlong Khwang in Bangkok, Soi Petchkasem 69 along Khlong Thawi Watthana, a canal that formed a boundary between Bang Khae and Nong Khaem Districts.

References

Subdistricts of Bangkok
Phasi Charoen district